Mesonychia ("middle claws") is an extinct taxon of small- to large-sized carnivorous ungulates related to artiodactyls. Mesonychids first appeared in the early Paleocene, went into a sharp decline at the end of the Eocene, and died out entirely when the last genus, Mongolestes, became extinct in the early Oligocene. In Asia, the record of their history suggests they grew gradually larger and more predatory over time, then shifted to scavenging and bone-crushing lifestyles before the group became extinct.

Mesonychids probably originated in China, where the most primitive mesonychid, Yangtanglestes, is known from the early Paleocene. They were also most diverse in Asia, where they occur in all major Paleocene faunas. Since other predators, such as creodonts and Carnivora, were either rare or absent in these animal communities, mesonychids most likely dominated the large predator niche in the Paleocene of eastern Asia.

One genus, Dissacus, had successfully spread to Europe and North America by the early Paleocene. Dissacus was a jackal-sized predator that has been found all over the Northern Hemisphere, but species of a closely related or identical genus, Ankalagon, from the early to middle Paleocene of New Mexico, were far larger, growing to the size of a bear. A later genus, Pachyaena, entered North America by the earliest Eocene, where it evolved into species that were at least as large. Mesonychids in North America were by far the largest predatory mammals during the early Paleocene to middle Eocene.

Characteristics

Mesonychids have often been reconstructed as resembling wolves albeit superficially, but they would have appeared very different in life. With a short lower spine stiffened by revolute joints, they would have run with stiff backs like modern ungulates rather than bounding or loping with flexible spines like modern Carnivorans. While later mesonychids evolved a suite of limb adaptations for running similar to those in both wolves and deer, their legs remained comparatively thick. They would have resembled no group of living animals. Early mesonychids probably walked on the flats of their feet (plantigrade), while later ones walked on their toes (digitigrade). These later mesonychids had hooves, one on each toe, with four toes on each foot. The foot was compressed for efficient running with the axis between the third and fourth toes (paraxonic); it would have looked something like a hoofed paw.

Mesonychids varied in size; some species were as small as a fox, others as large as a horse. Some members of the group are known only from skulls and jaws, or have fragmentary postcranial remains. But where skeletons are known, they indicate that mesonychids had large heads with strong jaw muscles, relatively long necks, and robust bodies with robust limbs that could run effectively but not rotate the hand or reach out to the side. An unrelated early group of mammalian predators, the creodonts, also had unusually large heads and limbs that traded flexibility for efficiency in running; large head size may be connected to inability to use the feet and claws to help catch and process food, as many modern carnivorans do. Some mesonychids are reconstructed as predatory (comparable to canids), others as scavengers or carnivore-scavengers with bone-crushing adaptations to their teeth (comparable to the large hyenas), and some as omnivorous (comparable to pigs, humans, or black bears). They may not have included hypercarnivores (comparable to felids); their teeth were not as effective at cutting meat as later groups of large mammalian predators. In some localities, multiple species or genera coexisted in different ecological niches. There is evidence to suggest that some genera were sexually dimorphic. Some genera may need revision to clarify the actual number of species or remove ambiguity about genera (such as Dissacus and Ankalagon).

These "wolves on hooves" were probably one of the more important predator groups in the late Paleocene and Eocene ecosystems of Europe (which was an archipelago at the time), Asia (which was an island continent), and North America. Mesonychid dentition consisted of molars modified to generate vertical shear, thin blade-like lower molars, and carnassial notches, but no true carnassials. The molars were laterally compressed and often blunt, and were probably used for shearing meat or crushing bones. The largest species are considered to have been scavengers. Many species are suspected of being fish-eaters, though some of these reconstructions may be influenced by earlier theories that the group was ancestral to cetaceans.

Phylogeny and evolutionary relationships

Mesonychians were long considered to be creodonts, but have now been removed from that order and placed in three families (Mesonychidae, Hapalodectidae, and Triisodontidae), either within their own order, Mesonychia, or within the order Condylarthra as part of the cohort or superorder Laurasiatheria. Nearly all mesonychids are, on average, larger than most of the Paleocene and Eocene creodonts and miacoid carnivorans.

The order is sometimes referred to by its older name Acreodi. Technically speaking, the term "mesonychid" refers specifically only to the members of the family Mesonychidae, such as the species of the genus Mesonyx. However, as the order is also renamed for Mesonyx, the term "mesonychid" is now used to refer to members of the entire order Mesonychia and the species of other families within it.

A recent study found mesonychians to be basal euungulates most closely related to the "arctocyonids" Mimotricentes, Deuterogonodon and Chriacus. "Triisodontidae" may be paraphyletic.

Relationship with whales

Mesonychids possess unusual triangular molar teeth that are similar to those of Cetacea (whales and dolphins), especially those of the archaeocetes, as well as having similar skull anatomies and other morphologic traits. For this reason, scientists had long believed that mesonychids were the direct ancestor of Cetacea, but the discovery of well-preserved hind limbs of archaic cetaceans, as well as more recent phylogenetic analyses now indicate cetaceans are more closely related to hippopotamids and other artiodactyls than they are to mesonychids, and this result is consistent with many molecular studies. The similarity in dentition and skull may be the result of primitive ungulate structures in related groups independently evolving to meet similar needs as predators; some researchers have suggested that the absence of a first toe and a reduced metatarsal are basal features (synapomorphies) indicating that mesonychids, perissodactyls, and artiodactyls are sister groups.

Most paleontologists now doubt that whales are descended from mesonychids, and instead suggest mesonychians are descended from basal ungulates, and that cetaceans are descended from advanced ungulates (Artiodactyla), either deriving from, or sharing a common ancestor with, anthracotheres (the semiaquatic ancestors of hippos). However, the close grouping of whales with hippopotami in cladistic analyses only surfaces following the deletion of Andrewsarchus, which has often been included within the mesonychids. One possible conclusion is that Andrewsarchus has been incorrectly classified. The current uncertainty may, in part, reflect the fragmentary nature of the remains of some crucial fossil taxa, such as Andrewsarchus.

References

 
Rupelian extinctions
Paleocene first appearances